was a small steam transportation warship belonging to the Navy of the Bakufu around 1860.

Vice Admiral Enomoto Takeaki, vice-commander of the Navy, refusing to remit his fleet to the new government and left Shinagawa on August 20, 1868, with four steam warships (Kaiyō, Kaiten, Banryū, Chiyodagata) and four steam transports (Kanrin, Mikaho, Shinsoku, Chōgei) as well as 2,000 members of the Navy, 36 members of the "Yugekitai" (reaction force) headed by Iba Hachiro, several officials of the former Bakufu government such as the vice-commander in chief of the Army Matsudaira Taro, Nakajima Saburosuke, and members of the French Military Mission to Japan, headed by Jules Brunet.

On August 21, the fleet encountered a typhoon off Choshi, in which the Mikaho was lost and the Kanrin, heavily damaged, forced to rally the coast, where she was captured in Shimizu.

Mikaho